Ostilio Ricci da Fermo (1540–1603) was an Italian mathematician.

Biography

He was a university professor in Florence at the Accademia delle Arti del Disegno, founded in 1560 by Giorgio Vasari. Ricci is also known for being Galileo Galilei's teacher.

Ricci was the Court Mathematician to the Grand Duke Francesco in Florence, in 1580, when Galileo attended his lectures in Pisa.

Galileo was enrolled at the University of Pisa, by his father Vincenzo, in order to study medicine. Instead, Galilei became more interested in mathematics, after meeting Ostilio Ricci, a former student of Niccolò Tartaglia. Ricci taught Galileo the mathematics of Euclid and Archimedes, who both deeply influenced Galileo's later work. Ricci considered mathematics not to be a distinct science, but a practical tool for problems in mechanics and engineering. Ostilio Ricci is systematically cited in the various biographies of Galileo Galilei.

He died at age 62, in Florence. Italy. His cause of death remains unknown.

Works
 Ostilio Ricci, Problemi di Geometria Pratica: L'uso dell'Archimetro, Manuscript, Florence, Biblioteca Nazionale, II – 57

Notes

References
 T. B. Settle, "Ostilio Ricci, a bridge between Alberti and Galileo", in XIIe Congrès International d'Histoire des Science, Actes, Paris, 1971, III B, pp. 121–126.
 F. Vinci, Ostilio Ricci da Fermo, Maestro di Galileo Galilei, Fermo, 1929.
 James Reston, Jr., Galileo: A Life,  Harper Collins, 1994.
 Albert Presas i Puig, Ostilio Ricci, the Practical Education and the Canon of Technical Knowledge at the Beginning of the Italian Renaissance, Max-Planck-Institut für Wissenschaftsgeschichte, Berlin, 2002.
 Osler, Margaret J. Reconfiguring the World: Nature, God, and Human Understanding from the Middle Ages to Early Modern Europe. Baltimore: Johns Hopkins UP, 2010.

External links
 
 , art. Ostilio Ricci, 1Ricci.com (2006).
 Ricci biography
 Ricci's AI genealogy
 Ricci's neurotree genealogy
 Galileo & Ricci
 Ricci's influence on Galileo

1540 births
1603 deaths
16th-century Italian mathematicians
People from Fermo